North Adelaide is a predominantly residential precinct and suburb of the City of Adelaide in South Australia, situated north of the River Torrens and within the Adelaide Park Lands.

History 

Surveyor-General Colonel William Light of the colony of South Australia completed the survey for the capital city of Adelaide by 10 March 1837. This surveyed land north of the river became North Adelaide.

North Adelaide was the birthplace of William Lawrence Bragg, co-recipient of the Nobel Prize for Physics in 1915.

It contains many heritage-listed buildings, including the North Adelaide Post Office.

Design 

North Adelaide consists of three grids of varying dimension to suit the geography. North Adelaide is surrounded by parklands, with public gardens between the grids. The North Adelaide park lands (the Adelaide Park Lands north of the River Torrens) contain gardens, many sports fields (including the Adelaide Oval), a golf course, horse agistment paddocks and some areas sympathetic with the native environment.

The northernmost (and largest) grid has Wellington Square at its centre, and O'Connell Street (named after Daniel O'Connell) as its main commercial street. O'Connell Street is the continuation of King William Road, and links the main street of Adelaide City with Main North Road. A tram used to run up O'Connell Street and Melbourne street; the government is investigating extending the Glenelg tram along King William Road to terminate at Brougham Place. O'Connell Street has many cafes, restaurants, burger bars, shops and six pubs. Lincoln College (University of Adelaide) and Aquinas College (a residential college run by the Marists for the Archdiocese of Adelaide, for students at any Adelaide university), are also situated in this grid. Tynte Street is another commercial street in the largest grid running between Wellington Square and the east parklands. It contains the North Adelaide Primary School, a public library, a civic hall, a post office and a pub. Also on Tynte Street are the studios of Adelaide's NWS-9, the local Nine Network affiliate.

The southernmost (and smallest) grid is bordered by Brougham Place to the north, Pennington Road to the south, Sir Edwin Smith Avenue to the east and Palmer Place with adjoining Palmer Gardens/Pangki Pangki to the west (these two named after Lt Col George Palmer (1799-1883), a South Australian Colonisation Commissioner). This area contains the Women's and Children's Hospital, the Memorial Hospital, St Peter's Cathedral, St. Mark's College, the Cathedral hotel (popular with cricket fans due its proximity to the Adelaide Oval), and the Queen's Head hotel (the oldest Adelaide pub, renovated in 2003).

The remaining (western) grid is termed Lower North Adelaide. It is nearest the Torrens floodplain. It contains Brougham Place Uniting Church, St. Ann's College, and four pubs. Melbourne Street, with cafes, restaurants, galleries, shops and two pubs, is its commercial street.

Leisure

Dining and pubs
O'Connell Street and Melbourne Street are known for their many restaurants.

Many of the North Adelaide pubs and hotels are heritage-listed.  there are 11 pubs operational in the suburb: five in (most on O'Connell Street):
in upper North Adelaide: the Caledonian, Royal Oak, Oxford, and Archer hotels (on O'Connell); and the Wellington on Wellington Square
in lower North Adelaide: the Old Lion, the Kentish Arms, Lord Melbourne, and The British 
In the cathedral grid: Queen's Head Hotel and the Cathedral Hotel

Piccadilly Cinema

The Piccadilly, also known as Piccadilly Cinema(s), and formerly Piccadilly Theatre and The Forum, is a cinema located on the corner of  O'Connell Street and Childers Street.

It was built for  D. Clifford Theatres Ltd. as the Piccadilly Theatre in 1940, in art deco / moderne style. It is heritage-listed on both the South Australian Heritage Register and the Register of the National Estate. Dan Clifford chose the name due to his association with the town of Piccadilly in the Adelaide Hills as well as the famous Piccadilly Circus in London. 

After Clifford's death in 1942, his theatres were bought by Greater Union in 1947, who renamed the Piccadilly as The Forum. In 1983 Wallis Cinemas bought the building in order to save it from being demolished, and reverted to its former name. During the 1990s Wallis converted the old picture palace into a multiplex with three screens.

After an 18-month closure to allow for a major renovation costing , the cinema is set to reopen on 15 December 2022. Apart from the interior refit of the theatres, installation of a lift and other features, a new licensed food and drinks lounge space have replaced the shopfronts O'Connell Street, where the original candy bar was situated.

Education 

The North Adelaide Primary School on Tynte Street was established in 1877 and is one of the oldest schools in South Australia. At 2007 its enrolment from reception to year seven was 250. The school's motto recorded on its World War One honour board is Esse quam videri, "To be, rather than to seem" and the school colours are red and blue.

Queen's College (1885–1949) on Barton Terrace was the longest lasting proprietary (i.e. privately owned and run) boys' college in Australia. Another private school of historical interest was North Adelaide Grammar School (aka. Whinham College).

Many residential colleges affiliated with the University of Adelaide are in North Adelaide, including Aquinas College, Lincoln College, St. Ann's College, St. Mark's College, Kathleen Lumley College (Postgraduate) and Australian Lutheran College, the Lutheran tertiary institution and seminary.

Transport 

North Adelaide is well served by road, although in peak hour some roads, particularly O'Connell Street and Melbourne Street, are quite congested.

North Adelaide railway station is located on the Gawler line of the Adelaide rail network. The railway station is however on the western edge of North Adelaide with infrequent services and is little used.

There are several Adelaide Metro bus routes that service the area on their way through to other suburbs. Buses run along several routes:

 King William Road, O'Connell Street, Ward Street, Hill Street, Mills Terrace then a bus only link to War Memorial Drive (since 1912, former electric tram route) 
 King William Road, O'Connell Street, Ward Street, Jeffcott Street and Jeffcott Road
 King William Road, O'Connell Street and Prospect Road (since 1883, former horse tram route)
 King William Road, O'Connell Street and Main North Road (since 1883, former horse tram route)
 King William Road, Sir Edwin Smith Avenue and Melbourne Street (since at least 1912, former electric tram route)
 Frome Road and Melbourne Street
 Montefiore Road and Jeffcott Street (since October 2006)

Since 27 January 2014 a free loop bus operated jointly between the Adelaide City Council and the state government circulates through Adelaide and North Adelaide replacing a community bus operated by the Adelaide City Council.

There is provision for bicycles along LeFevre Terrace/Frome Road and Montefiore Road/Jeffcott Street/Wellington Square and many of the streets have little traffic and are bicycle friendly.

Residents 

In the 2016 Census, there were 6,950 people in North Adelaide. North Adelaide has a much lower proportion of its population below 14 years (2.4% 0–4 years, 2.3% 5–9 years, 2.2% 10–14 years) compared to South Australia as a whole (6.3% 0–4 years, 6.4% 5–9 years, 6.0% 10–14 years). Conversely, the proportion of the population 20–29 years (14.2% 20–24 years, 10.4% 25–29 years) is much greater than South Australia as a whole (6.4% 20–24 years, 6.4% 25–29 years).

60.7% of people were born in Australia. The next most common countries of birth were England 5.2%, China 3.3% and India 2.5%. 70.5% of people spoke only English at home. Other languages spoken at home included Mandarin 3.9%, Italian 1.7%, Greek 1.5%.

The most common responses for religion were No Religion 37.1% and Catholic 16.3%.

The median household income of $1,693 was more than the South Australian median of $1,206. The most common occupations in North Adelaide included Professionals 39.3%, Managers 15.8%, Clerical and Administrative Workers 11.8%, Community and Personal Service Workers 11.7%, and Sales Workers 8.2%.

Built form 
There were 2,659 occupied private dwellings of which 43.6% were semi detached, 28.7 were flat or apartments and 26.4% were separate houses.  The average household size in North Adelaide is 1.9, less than the South Australian average of 2.4. There are many significant heritage buildings in the area.

Politics 

North Adelaide is part of the state electoral district of Adelaide, which has been held since 2022 by Labor MP Lucy Hood. In federal politics, the suburb is part of the division of Adelaide, and has been represented since 2004 by a Labor MP, since 2019 being Steve Georganas. North Adelaide has one or two polling booths for federal and state elections, North Adelaide at the North Adelaide Primary School and for most elections, Lower/East North Adelaide at St Cyprian's Anglican Church. The first preference votes by booths for recent state and federal elections are shown in tables.

In local government, North Adelaide forms the North ward within the City of Adelaide. Since 2018 the North Ward Councillors are Mary Couros and Phillip Martin. Significant local issues since 2010 have included:

 Adelaide oval precinct 
 Barton Road bus link 
 LeCornu development site 
 Height limits on developments 
 Late night closing of hotels
 Redevelopment of the Adelaide Aquatic Centre by the Adelaide Crows

References

Further reading

External links 
 

 
Suburbs of Adelaide